Joseph John Williams (March 19, 1915 – May 5, 1997) was an American football back who played two seasons in the National Football League with the Cleveland Rams and Pittsburgh Pirates. He played college football at Ohio State University and attended Barberton High School in Barberton, Ohio.

References

External links
Just Sports Stats

1915 births
1997 deaths
Players of American football from Ohio
American football running backs
American football defensive backs
Ohio State Buckeyes football players
Cleveland Rams players
Pittsburgh Pirates (football) players
People from Barberton, Ohio